is  the  assistant coach of the Levanga Hokkaido in the Japanese B.League.

Head coaching record

|- 
| style="text-align:left;"|Bambitious Nara
| style="text-align:left;"|2014-15
| 52||12||40|||| style="text-align:center;"|10th in Western|||-||-||-||
| style="text-align:center;"|-
|-
| style="text-align:left;"|Saitama Broncos
| style="text-align:left;"|2015-16
| 52||5||47|||| style="text-align:center;"|11th in Eastern|||-||-||-||
| style="text-align:center;"|-
|-
| style="text-align:left;"|Shinshu Brave Warriors
| style="text-align:left;"|2016-17
| 60||14||46|||| style="text-align:center;"|6th in B2 Central|||-||-||-||
| style="text-align:center;"|-
|-
| style="text-align:left;"|Shinshu Brave Warriors
| style="text-align:left;"|2017-18
| 60||25||35|||| style="text-align:center;"|5th in B2 Central|||-||-||-||
| style="text-align:center;"|-
|-
| style="text-align:left;"|Yamagata Wyverns
| style="text-align:left;"|2018-19
| 60||22||38|||| style="text-align:center;"|5th in B2 Eastern|||-||-||-||
| style="text-align:center;"|-

References

1981 births
Living people
Bambitious Nara coaches
Japanese basketball coaches
Nippon Tornadoes coaches
Saitama Broncos coaches
Saitama Broncos players
Shimane Susanoo Magic coaches
Shinshu Brave Warriors coaches